Thoridae is a family of cleaner shrimp, also known as broken-back shrimp or anemone shrimp.

Genera
There are 36 recognised genera in the family:

Eualus Thallwitz, 1892
Eumanningia Crosnier, 2000
Exhippolysmata Stebbing, 1915
Gelastocaris Kemp, 1914
Gelastreutes Bruce, 1990
Heptacarpus Holmes, 1900
Latreutes Stimpson, 1860
Lebbeus White, 1847
Leontocaris Stebbing, 1905
Lysmatella Borradaile, 1915
Merhippolyte Bate, 1888
Mimocaris Nobili, 1903
Nauticaris Bate, 1888
Paralatreutes Kemp, 1925
Paralebbeus Bruce & Chace, 1986
Phycocaris Kemp, 1916
Saron Thallwitz, 1891
Spirontocaris Bate, 1888
Thinora Bruce, 1998
Thor Kingsley, 1878
Thorella Bruce, 1982
Tozeuma Stimpson, 1860
Trachycaris Calman, 1906

Morphological and genetic studies show that Thoridae is distinct from Hippolytidae.

References

Alpheoidea
Crustacean families